The County High School, Leftwich, is a coeducational secondary school with academy status, for students between 11 and 16 years of age, in Leftwich, Cheshire, England.

History

The school was established in 1957 as the Northwich County Grammar School for Girls. The school was later known as Leftwich High School until the early 1990s before becoming the County High School Leftwich.

Comprehensive
The school became a comprehensive in September 1978, with sixth form pupils from the school and the former Sir John Deane's Grammar School going to the new Sir John Deane's College.

Academy
The school converted to academy status on 1 September 2012. The school is in partnership with Sir John Deane's College as part of the Sir John Brunner Foundation.

Academic performance
The school gets good GCSE results, well above the England average, and slightly above the Cheshire average. Results have steadily improved over the last 6 years. The 2016 Ofsted inspection graded the school as "outstanding" (the highest rating available). In the 2015/16 academic year the school achieved its highest ever result with 86% of students receiving at least 5 GCSEs at grades A*-C. This result put the school as the top rated secondary comprehensive in Cheshire

Notable former pupils

Northwich County Grammar School for Girls
Sue Birtwistle, television producer of well-known BBC costume dramas such as the 1995 Pride and Prejudice and the 1996 Emma
Moira Buffini, playwright, film director and actress, who notably wrote the 2010 play Handbagged about Queen Elizabeth II and Margaret Thatcher, and the 2010 film Tamara Drewe
Diana Johnson, Labour MP since 2005 for Hull North (in attendance from 1977 to 1982)
Jennifer Saunders, comedian, best known as half of French and Saunders and for the television series Absolutely Fabulous
Shirley Strong, Olympic hurdler, who won the silver medal in women's 100 metres hurdles at the 1984 Summer Olympics in Los Angeles (attended 1970–75)

Leftwich High School
Tim Burgess, lead singer of English alternative rock band The Charlatans.
 Michelle Donelan MP

References

Articles containing potentially dated statements from 2016
Secondary schools in Cheshire West and Chester
Educational institutions established in 1957
Academies in Cheshire West and Chester
1957 establishments in England